Cruz is a surname of Iberian origin, first found in Castile, Spain, but later spread throughout the territories of the former Spanish and Portuguese Empires. In Spanish and Portuguese, the word means "cross", either the Christian cross or the figure of transecting lines or ways. For example, in the Philippines, the adopted Tagalog word is rendered to "krus" in plain usage, but the Spanish spelling survives as a surname.

The word "Cruz" (Spanish for "Cross"), as well as "Vera Cruz" ("True Cross") and "Santa Cruz" ("Holy Cross") are used as surnames and toponyms. Its origin as a surname particularly flourished after the Alhambra Decree of 1492 and the increasing activities of the Spanish Inquisition, when New Christian families with Crypto-Jewish, Moorish, and/or mixed religious heritage converted to the state-enforced religion of Catholicism and subsequently fashioned and adopted surnames with unambiguous religious affiliation.

People with the surname

General
Alberto Cruz (disambiguation), multiple people
Alejandro Cruz (disambiguation), multiple people
Alex Cruz (disambiguation), multiple people
Arturo Cruz (1923–2013), Nicaraguan rebel leader
Carlos Cruz (disambiguation), multiple people
Isagani Cruz (c. 1924 – 2013), Filipino judge
Juan-Carlos Cruz (born 1962), Dominican American celebrity chef
Maria Silva Cruz (1915-1936), Spanish anarchist
Maximiano Tuazon Cruz (1923–2013), Filipino Roman Catholic bishop
Nicky Cruz (born 1938), Puerto Rican-American ex-gang leader and religious minister
Nikolas Cruz (born 1998), American criminal suspect in the Stoneman Douglas High School shooting
Oswaldo Cruz (1872–1917), Brazilian physician, bacteriologist, and epidemiologist
Richard Cruz (disambiguation), multiple people

Arts

General
Amina Cruz, American photographer
Claudia Cruz (born 1986), Dominican Miss World contestant 2004
Gaspar da Cruz (ca. 1520–1570), Portuguese Dominican friar, author of the first European book on China
Gemma Cruz, Filipino crowned Miss International
Nilo Cruz (born 1962), Cuban-American playwright and Pulitzer prize winner

Actors and Actresses
General
Ernesto Gómez Cruz (born 1933), Mexican actor
Ileana D'Cruz, Indian actress from Goa
Mónica Cruz (born 1977), Spanish dancer and actress; sister of Penélope Cruz
Penélope Cruz (born 1974), Spanish actress

American
Raphael Cruz, American acrobat, Cirque du Soleil performer and actor
Wilson Cruz (born 1973), Puerto Rican-American actor
Alexis Cruz (born 1974), Puerto Rican-American actor
Brandon Cruz (born 1962), American actor and musician

Filipino
Donna Cruz (born 1977), Filipina actress and singer
Ella Cruz (born 1996), Filipino Actress
Geneva Cruz (born 1976), Filipino actress and singer
Jesse Cruz, birth name of Ricky Belmonte (1947-2001), Filipino actor
John Lloyd Cruz (born 1983), Filipino actor
Rayver Cruz (born 1989), Filipino actor/dancer
Rodjun Cruz (born 1987), Filipino actor/dancer
Sheryl Cruz (born 1974), Filipino actress
Sunshine Cruz (born 1977), Filipino actress
Tirso Cruz III (born 1953, Filipino actor

Musical Artists
General
Celia Cruz (1924-2003), Cuban salsa singer
Simon Cruz, Swedish singer of glam metal band Crashdïet
Taio Cruz, British singer (born Adetayo Ayowale O. A. Onile-Ere)

American
Adam Cruz, American jazz drummer
Tony Sunshine (Antonio Cruz, born 1977), Puerto Rican R&B singer
Bobby Cruz (born 1937), Puerto Rican salsa singer and religious minister
Jason Cruz (born 1974), American musician, artist, poet

Politicians
Angel Cruz, a member of the Pennsylvania House of Representatives, 180th District
Benjamin Cruz (born 1951), Guamanian politician
Catalina Cruz (born 1980s), New York politician
Gina Cruz Blackledge (born 1969), Mexican politician, Senator from Baja California since 2018
Inmaculada Cruz (1960–2013), Spanish politician
Ted Cruz (born 1970), (Rafael Edward Cruz) Canadian-American politician and United States Senator from Texas since 2013

Sports
Adolfo Schwelm Cruz (1923–2012), Argentine Formula One race car driver
Beatriz Cruz (born 1980), Puerto Rican track and field athlete
Carl Bryan Cruz (born 1991), Filipino basketball player
Dominick Cruz (born 1985), American professional mixed martial artist
Iohana Cruz (born 1980), Cuban diver
Jericho Cruz (born 1990), Filipino basketball player
Jervy Cruz (born 1986), Filipino basketball player
Joaquim Cruz (born 1963), Brazilian athlete and Olympic gold medal winner
Julio Ricardo Cruz (born 1974), former Argentine soccer player
Leo Cruz (born 1957), Dominican boxing champion
Nelson Cruz (athlete) (born 1977), long-distance runner from Cape Verde
Raúl Ceferino Cruz (1934–1985), Argentine chess master
Rolando Cruz (born 1939), Puerto Rican pole vaulter
Roque Santa Cruz (born 1981), Paraguayan football player
Victor Cruz (American football) (born 1986), wide receiver
Wendy Cruz (born 1976), Dominican Republic cyclist

Baseball
Edvandro Cruz (born 1978), Brazilian mountain biker
Fernando Cruz (baseball) (born 1990), Puerto Rican baseball player
Frank Cruz (born c. 1959), American college baseball coach
Jesús Cruz (born 1995), Mexican baseball player
José Cruz also known as Cheo Cruz (born 1947), Puerto Rican baseball player
José Cruz Jr. (born 1974), Puerto Rican baseball player
Juan Cruz (born 1978), Dominican baseball player
Luis Cruz (born 1984), American baseball player
Nelson Cruz (born 1980), baseball outfielder from Monte Cristi, Dominican Republic
Nelson Cruz (pitcher) (born 1972), baseball pitcher from Puerto Plata, Dominican Republic
Oneil Cruz (born 1998), Dominican baseball player

Volleyball
Áurea Cruz (born 1982), Puerto Rican volleyball player
Eva Cruz (born 1974), Puerto Rican volleyball player
Flávio Cruz (born 1982), Portuguese volleyball player
Jacqueline Cruz Silva (born 1962), Brazilian beach volleyball player

As a given name
Cruz Bustamante (born 1953), American politician
Cruz Martínez Esteruelas (1932–2000), Spanish politician
Cruz Reynoso (1932-2021), American civil rights lawyer and jurist.

Fictional characters
Artemio Cruz, protagonist of the novel La muerte de Artemio Cruz by Carlos Fuentes
Ernesto De La Cruz, the main antagonist of Coco
Kaylie Cruz, fictional character on the ABC Family series, Make It or Break It
Maritza Cruz, police sergeant in the television drama Third Watch
Ramiro "Ram" Cruz, the main protagonist of the games Total Overdose and Chili Con Carnage
Soma Cruz in the video game Castlevania: Aria of Sorrow
 Sonia Cruz, a character in the Netflix series Grand Army
Jessica Cruz, a Green Lantern from DC Comics.
Cruz Ramirez, a character in Cars 3    
Cruz Coronado, protagonist of Explorer Academy

See also
Cruz (disambiguation), other meanings
De la Cruz surname page
Santa Cruz (disambiguation)
Veracruz (disambiguation)
Croce 
Cruise (name)
Cruiser (disambiguation)
Cruising (disambiguation)
Cruse (disambiguation)
Cruze (disambiguation)
Cruzer
Kruse (disambiguation)

Portuguese-language surnames
Spanish-language surnames
Surnames of Spanish origin